Liberty High School is one of the three high schools in Bedford County, Virginia. Liberty High School opened in 1964. Its mascot is the "Minuteman." School colors are red, white and navy blue. The school serves students from Villamont, Thaxton, Montvale, Big Island and Bedford. The principal of Liberty High School is Mr. Justin Tucker, and the assistant principals are Dawn Verhoeff and Ernie Sawyer.

Student body 
The 2009-2010 enrollment was 1,004 in grades 9-12. Racial makeup of the school is approx. 78% White, 21% Black, and 1% other.

Academics 
Approximately 80% of the students who go to LHS graduate. 52% of the 2004 graduates continued their formal education beyond high school. Liberty High School participates in an Early College program with Central Virginia Community College where students apply to receive their junior and senior classes at the college itself, thus earning them a two-year degree before they graduate high school. Several students also attend the Central Virginia Governor's School in Lynchburg, VA. In 2015, Glen Field received a full scholarship from the Jefferson Scholars Foundation, of which less than 3% of all applicants are selected.

History 
In 1964, when smaller schools were consolidated into one, Liberty High School came into existence with Mr. William N. Lee at its head as principal.

Following the 2018-19 School Year, long-time principal Dr. Kathy Dills retired due to medical reasons. The assistant principal and principal positions have changed almost annually ever since.

Athletics 
Liberty competes in the Class AA Region III Seminole District. Liberty has won state championships in Football(2002) (set a Virginia High School League team rushing record for a state championship game at 529 yards against New Kent High School, which was broken by Amherst County High School in 2007), Basketball (1995–96, 1996–97) and Baseball (1977). Erik Kuster won two state championships(2007), one in shot-put and the other in discus. In 2008, Kenara Hurt won the 55 meter dash at the State Meet. In 2010, Brandon Sparrow was the State Champion in shot-put. Craig Danner won the state championship in the 1000m run during the 2012-2013 indoor track and field season and Mikalah Jones was the triple jump State Champion in Outdoor track. The 2013-2014 school year state championships: Nicole Smith in the Outdoor Track discus throw, Mikalah Jones in the Indoor Track triple jump, and Alexus Pannell, Megan Beisser, Kennedy Flynn, and Ryan Ridley in the Outdoor Track 4x400 meter relay.

Liberty's football team was also ranked the 19th best team of the decade in the State of Virginia.  These rankings were done by virginiapreps.com in the beginning of 2008.

The Liberty High School current baseball coach is Jeremy Sink. He is the former head baseball coach of E.C. Glass High School as well as an assistant coach at the University of Lynchburg From its opening in 1964 to 2005, Liberty's baseball team was coached by the honorable Jim Cutler. He won one state championship in 1977, the school's first team Championship. In 2005, Stewart Grant took over as baseball coach, where he stayed until 2011. Following Grant was Mike Thompson. Thompson coached the Minutemen from 2011-2014.

Liberty's Girls Softball team won the State Championship in 2019 with Mike Thompson at the helm.

References

External links
Liberty High School

Public high schools in Virginia
Schools in Bedford County, Virginia
Educational institutions established in 1964
1964 establishments in Virginia